Boleigh is a hamlet southeast of St Buryan in west Cornwall, England, UK. The Newlyn School artist, Samuel Birch, later known as Lamorna Birch came to Cornwall in 1892, initially staying at Boleigh Farm.

References

Hamlets in Cornwall
Penwith